Kunsthall Trondheim (KT) is a contemporary art institution in Trondheim, Norway. Located in a former firehall, KT opened in October 2016. Between 2013 and 2016, the Kunsthall was run as a preliminary project in a temporary space by former Director Helena Holmberg. Stefanie Hessler was Director from 2019 until 2022; Adam Kleinman has been the Director since 2023.  The facility offers exhibitions and public programs.

Exhibitions

2013
 Straight Line (Stevens-Duke) Tomislav Gotovac
 Redwood, Hemvist og Kraftverk; Italics og Inverse Night Sky Lotta Lotass, Peter Thörneby
 Self Fashion Show Tibor Hajas
 Music While We Work Hong-Kai Wang
 The Broken Orchestra Live in Trondheim Hong-Kai Wang
 N.P. 1977 Neša Paripović

2014
 Freedom of Expression Dan Perjovschi
 Present Stability Silje Figenschou Thoresen
 Vannskille – Watershed, Divide Simen Engen Larsen
 Silphium Lina Selander
 On the Edge, Breaking Into Business Alex Villar
 Library of The Evil Spirit Ulla West

2015
 Meshes of the Afternoon Meriç Algün Ringborg, Maya Deren, Marianne Heske, Alevtina Kakhidsze, Lada Nakonechna, Karianne Stensland – a satellite venue of Kyiv Biennale 2015: The School of Kyiv.
 Objects That Don't Fit Together, Words That Suddenly Change Meaning Wenche Gulbransen
 Summer Thoughts Sven Augustijnen
 The Music Box Jonas Dahlberg

2016
 this is a political (painting) A K Dolven, Alexandra Pirici, Claire Fontaine, Kajsa Dahlberg, VALIE EXPORT

2017
 Notes From Underground Lisa Tan
 A New We Amanda Ackerman & Dan Richert, Arendse Krabbe, Asbjørn Skou, FRAUD (Fran Gallardo & Audrey Samson), Honey Biba Beckerlee, Karin Bolender, Kathy High, Oskar Jakobsen, Rachel Mayeri, Rosemary Lee, Ursula Biemann, a rawlings
 noe beveger seg sakte i en annen retning Carola Grahn, Iver Jåks, Ragna Misvær Grønstad, Silje Figenschou Thoresen, Sissel M. Bergh, niilas helander
 On Coexistence Marjetica Potrč
 A Series of Gestures Aimée Zito Lema
 Andrei’s Maria Ingela Johansson
 Continents and I am Naked Nástio Mosquito

2018
 Strømmer av følelser, kropper av malm Anja Örn, Bodil Furu, David Blandy, Eline McGeorge, Fanny Carinasdotter, Hanna Ljungh, Ignas Krunglevičius, Joshua Portway, Karianne Stensland, Lawrence Lek, Lise Autogena, Liv Bugge, Louis Henderson, Marianne Heier, Rikke Luther, Sean Dockray, Tomas Örn
 What Fades in the Sun Lotte Konow Lund
 The Reading Adelita Husni-Bey – originally presented at the Italian Pavilion, 57th Venice Biennale.
 Works on Books Ane Mette Hol, Aron Kullander-Östling, Daniel Eatock, Esther Maria Bjørneboe, Fraser Muggeridge, Hans Petter Blad, John Morgan, Jonathan Monk, Kim Hiorthøy, Lenka Clayton, Michael Dumontier, Michael Marriott, Miriam Myrstad, Monica Aasprong, OK-RM, Åbäke
 Spirit Labour Adrian Heathfield, Hugo Glendinning
 Local Land Oddvar I.N. Darén
 Furniture Isn’t Just Furniture & Freedom Requires Free People Ane Hjort Guttu

2019
 A beast, a god, and a line Ampannee Satoh, Anand Patwardhan, Anida Yoeu Ali, Apichatpong Weerasethakul, Celestine Fadul, Chai Siris, Chandrakanth Chitara, Charles Lim, Christy Chow, Cian Dayrit, Daniel Boyd, Dilara Begum Jolly, Etan Pavavalung, Garima Gupta, Gauri Gill, Huang Rui, Ines Doujak, Jaffa Lam, Jakrawal Nilthamrong, Jimmy Ong, Jiun-Yang Li, Joydeb Roaja, Jrai Dew Collective, Jöel Andrianomearisoa, Lantian Xie, Lavanya Mani, Malala Andrialavidrazana, Manish Nai, Ming Wong, Moelyono, Nabil Ahmed, Nguyen Trinh Thi, Nontawat Numbenchapol, Norberto Roldan, Paul Pfeiffer, Raja Umbu, Rajesh Vangad, Rashid Choudhury, Sarah Naqvi, Sarat Mala Chakma, Sawangwongse Yawnghwe, Sheela Gowda, Sheelasha Rajbhandari, Simon Soon, Simryn Gill, Su Yu Hsien, Taloi Havini, Than Sok, Thao Nguyen Phan, Trevor Yeung, Trương Công Tùng, Tuguldur Yondonjamts, Zamthingla Ruivah – curated by Cosmin Costinaș, and organised by Para Site, Hong Kong; Dhaka Art Summit, Dhaka; and the Museum of Modern Art, Warsaw.
 Wonderland Pia Arke, curated by Katrine Elise Pedersen.
 CONFERENCE Anna Daniel
 Partiturutstilling Mats Gustavsson
 mind moves with matter, body blends into space Ann Iren Buan, Brit Dyrnes, Francesca Woodman, Thora Dolven Balke, Tibor Hajas, Éva Mag
 Sowing Somankidi Coura. A Generative Archive Bouba Touré, Kaddu Yaraax, Raphaël Grisey, Sidney Sokhona, curated by Carl Martin Faurby.
 Francine (was a machine) Marte Aas

2020
 Into the World Dea Trier Mørch
 Who Wants to Live Forever? Oreet Ashery, Solveig Bergene, Gideonsson/Londré, Jessica Harvey, Moa Israelsson, Britta Marakatt-Labba, Mercedes Mühleisen, Adrian Piper, Tabita Rezaire, The Deep Field Project (Diann Bauer, Jol Thoms, Neal White), and Anton Vidokle
NO NO NSE NSE Jenna Sutela
 Making of Earths Geocinema (Asia Bazdyrieva, Solveig Suess)

2021
 Songs for Dying Korakrit Arunanondchai
 Nets of Hyphae Diana Policarpo
 Distance Sverre Bjertnæs 
 "How did you feel when you come out of the wilderness" Frida Orupabo
 Sex Ecologies, group exhibition

References

External links
 Official website

2013 establishments in Norway
Art galleries established in 2013
Art museums and galleries in Norway
Buildings and structures in Trondheim
Organisations based in Trondheim
Culture in Trondheim